The Estadio Colima is a multi-use stadium in Colima City.  It is currently used mostly for football matches and is the home stadium for Palmeros  The stadium has a capacity of 12,000 people.

References

External links

Estadio Colima
Sport in Colima
Athletics (track and field) venues in Mexico
Event venues with year of establishment missing